Bogaha Kotuwe Gedara Niluka Geethani Rajasekara (born 17 March 1982) is a female Sri Lankan long-distance runner. With a time of 2 hours 40.07 minutes, and a new Sri Lankan record, at the 2015 Hong Kong marathon, Rajasekara achieved the qualifying standard for the marathon at the 2016 Summer Olympics. She competed in the marathon event at the 2015 World Championships in Athletics in Beijing, China, finishing 49th.

At the 2015 Hong Kong marathon on 25 January 2015 she ran a Sri Lankan record in the marathon in a time of 2 hours 40.07 minutes. At the 2016 Summer Olympics she finished 129th out of a field of 157.

See also
 Sri Lanka at the 2015 World Championships in Athletics

References

External links
 

1982 births
Living people
Sportspeople from Kandy
Sri Lankan female long-distance runners
Sri Lankan female marathon runners
World Athletics Championships athletes for Sri Lanka
Athletes (track and field) at the 2016 Summer Olympics
Olympic athletes of Sri Lanka
20th-century Sri Lankan women
21st-century Sri Lankan women